The name Krasnoluzhsky Bridge refers to three existing bridges across Moskva River, located between Kievsky Rail Terminal and Luzhniki in Moscow.

Krasnoluzhsky Rail Bridge (1907, structure replacement 2001) 

The original Nicholas II Bridge (Мост Николая II) and its twin, Sergievsky Bridge (now known as Andreyevsky Bridge, Андреевский мост) were built in 1903–1907. They carried two tracks of Moscow Inner Ring Railroad across the Luzhniki bend. Both were designed as through arch bridges by Lavr Proskuryakov (structural engineering) and Alexander Pomerantsev (architectural design). The 135-meter steel arch of Nicholas II Bridge (1400 metric tons) was made at Sormovo works. Proskuryakov's work, considered a marvel of engineering, was proven by the 1908 flood: water level exceeded the maximum design specification by a meter and a half; the bridges stood unharmed. After the February Revolution of 1917, the tzarist title was replaced with a politically correct Krasnoluzhsky, literally Red Meadows. In 1926 the builder, Lavr Proskuryakov, was buried at Novodevichy Cemetery - right next to the bridge.

In 1952–1956, the arched stone pillars over embankments were extended from one to two spans (each side) to accommodate street traffic; inner steel frame of these arches was replaced by concrete. Eventually, after more than 90 years of service, the bridge required extensive repairs. The City preferred to replace the whole steel structure with a brand new arch over existing pillars; this was completed in 2001. New steel arch is superficially similar (but not identical) to Proskuryakov's original design. The function of the bridge was not changed, it carries a railway line across Moskva River.

Krasnoluzhsky Road Bridge (1998) 

In the 1990s, the City built the Third Ring Road (Moscow), parallel to existing railway tracks. New Krasnoluzhsky Road Bridge (Краснолужский автодорожный мост) construction began in September 1997 and completed in 1998. Designers took care to make the new concrete bridge "blend" with Proskuryakov's arch, thus the main span of a dual box girder bridge is set to 144.5 meters (complete formula is 24+110+144.5+110+24). Roadway is 39.5 meters wide (8 regular lanes, 2 reserve lanes, a single foot and bicycle lane).

Originally, the bridge was known as Berezhkovsky (Бережковский). This title appears in a contractor's illustrated report available online.

Bogdan Khmelnitsky (Kievsky) Pedestrian Bridge (2001) 

Instead of scrapping the old steel arch, city planners re-used it as a structural core of the new pedestrian bridge, half a mile upstream. Originally named Kievsky (Киевский мост), i.e. "Kiev Bridge", this bridge is now officially named after Bohdan Khmelnytskyi (Мост Богдана Хмельницкого), hetman of the Zaporozhian Cossack Hetmanate of Ukraine. Main pedestrian walkway and stairs are completely enclosed in a glass canopy; there are two open-air side walkways, which are usually closed to the public. Shoreside pillars and staircases of grey stone are a close but simplified copy of the original Krasnoluzhsky bridge approaches. The bridge was opened on the official Day of Moscow, 2 September 2001. Completion was in such a rush that it made its way into the official Bridges of Moscow reference book (2004 edition): "One week before opening, there were six cranes and derricks working 24 hours a day!"

See also 
Andreyevsky Bridge
List of bridges in Moscow

References 

Bridges in Moscow
Through arch bridges
Railway bridges in Russia
Pedestrian bridges in Russia
Bridges completed in 1907
Bridges completed in 1998
Bridges completed in 2001
Road bridges in Russia
1907 establishments in the Russian Empire